Apatlaco is a station along Line 8 of the metro of Mexico City.

The station's logo is a house with hot water and steam inside of it. Apatlaco is a Nahuatl word that means "place of medicinal baths".  The station was opened on 20 July 1994.

Ridership at the station dipped during a swine flu panic in the spring of 2009.

Ridership

References

External links 
 

Apatlaco
Railway stations opened in 1994
1994 establishments in Mexico
Mexico City Metro stations in Iztapalapa